Beneath the Leaves is a 2019 American thriller film co-written and directed by Adam Marino. The film was released on February 8, 2019, on Netflix.

Plot
Detective Brian Larson must recapture James Whitley, a psychopath who victimized him and three other boys as children, when Whitley escapes from prison.

Cast
 Mira Sorvino as Detective Erica Shotwell
 Kristoffer Polaha as Detective Brian Larson
 Doug Jones as James Whitley 
 Aaron Farb as Detective Abrams 
 Ser'Darius Blain as Josh Ridley
 Paul Sorvino as Captain Parker
 Christopher Backus as Matt Tresner
 Yvonne Miranda as Reporter Hawkins

Release
Michael Rechtshaffen from the Los Angeles Times disliked the movie, stating: "A committed cast fails to elevate "Beneath the Leaves," an otherwise draggy and derivative thriller about a psychotic killer whose M.O. involves fatally injecting his victims with potassium chloride before harvesting their fingernails." John DeFore writing for The Hollywood Reporter said: "A by-the-book script and stiff direction fail to milk any suspense from this scenario and, in the absence of thrills, the picture's heavy focus on the long-lasting impact of trauma is suffocating. Sorvino and Polaha have no chemistry in their scenes away from the action, and some viewers who have admired the actress' vocal contributions to current harassment/assault debates will cringe at a scene where the lines "You want me to go?" and "Yes" are treated as an invitation to sex. Jones, most often seen under creature makeup, brings a few physical flourishes to his cookie-cutter psycho role, but not nearly enough to make it memorable." Roger Moore from the "Movie Nation" gave the film 1.5 out of 4 stars and wrote that it "keeps us at arm's length and the cast at half-speed, a disappointing combination when your aim was an intricate, raw-nerves thriller with visceral violence, surprises, and characters we connect with enough to root for."

References

External links
 
 

2019 films
2019 thriller films
American thriller films
2010s English-language films
2010s American films